The Shuanghuan SCEO is an off-road vehicle manufactured by the Chinese auto maker Shuanghuan Auto based in Shijiazhuang, Hebei.

The company has copied the looks of the Toyota Land Cruiser Prado inside and at the front end, the BMW X5 (E53) at the rear end, and the BMW X3 at the sides.

The Shuanghuan SCEO's codename is known as the HBJ6474Y.

History
The SCEO was launched in China in 2005, which was sold at 123800-159800 yuan.

The SCEO was exported to more than 30 countries, according to a company report in 2006.

BMW copy claim

The SCEO's design was the cause of many disputes when the company wanted to show it at the Frankfurt Motor Show in 2007.

In June 2008, the Regional Court of Munich ruled that the Chinese SUV brand, "Shuang-huan SCEO" is a copy of the BMW X5, prohibited the defendant importer of these vehicles in the "trade in Germany" offer and ordered the destruction of all "vehicles with a certain look" at which the defendant's possession or ownership (Az.: 4HK O 16807/07).

Following a court case in Germany brought by BMW, the car was banned from sale in Germany. It was sold in Italy and central Europe, following BMW losing its court case in Italy.

Specification
The SCEO is powered by a choice of two 4-cylinder gasoline engines and a diesel option: a 2.0-litre producing  and a 2.4-litre producing . A 2.5-litre diesel option provides . The engines are sourced from Shenyang Aerospace Mitsubishi Motors Engine Manufacturing Corporation.

The SCEO was available in either automatic or manual transmission.

References

External links

Official Webseite of Martin Motors
SCEO official website

Off-road vehicles
Cars of China
Crossover sport utility vehicles
All-wheel-drive vehicles
Cars introduced in 2007
Plagiarism controversies